Heritage Trail can refer to heritage trails in specific locations:

 Black Heritage Trail
 Heritage Trail (Iowa), US
 Jewish Heritage Trail in Białystok, Poland 
 Monmouth Heritage Trail in Wales, UK
 Orange Heritage Trailway, New York, US
 Ping Shan Heritage Trail, Hong Kong
 Sacagawea Heritage Trail, Washington State, US
 Steam Heritage Trail, Isle of Man
 Three Rivers Heritage Trail, Pittsburgh, US
 Washington Heritage Trail, a byway in West Virginia, US

Heritage trails